The following article comprises the results of the Black Sticks, the women's national field hockey team from New Zealand, from 2016 until 2020. New fixtures can be found on the International Hockey Federation's results portal.

Match results

2016 Results

Argentina Test Series

Canada Test Series

III Hawke's Bay Cup

International Hockey Open

Netherlands Test Match

XXII Champions Trophy

Games of the XXXI Olympiad

Trans–Tasman Trophy

Malaysia Test Series

2017 Results

Argentina Test Series

United States Test Series

IV Hawke's Bay Cup

India Test Series

Spain Test Series

FIH World League Semifinals

X Oceania Cup

FIH World League Final

2018 Results

Argentina Test Series

XXI Commonwealth Games

Tri–Nations Tournament

Four Nations Cup

XIV FIH World Cup

2019 Results

FIH Pro League

Oceania Cup

2020 Results

FIH Pro League

References

2011
2016 in women's field hockey
2017 in women's field hockey
2018 in women's field hockey
2019 in women's field hockey
2020 in women's field hockey
field hockey
field hockey
field hockey
field hockey
field hockey